Anthony Perkins (April 4, 1932 – September 12, 1992) was an American actor, director, and singer. Perkins is known for his role as Norman Bates in Alfred Hitchcock's suspense thriller Psycho, which made him an influential figure in pop culture and in horror films. He often played distinctive villainous roles in film, though he was most renowned for his romantic leads. He distinguished himself by playing unconfident characters.

Born in New York City, Perkins got his start as an adolescent in summer stock programs, although he acted in films before he set foot on a professional stage. His first film, The Actress, costarring Spencer Tracy and Jean Simmons and directed by George Cukor, was a disappointment save for an Oscar nod for its costumes, and Perkins returned to the boards instead. He made his Broadway debut in the Elia Kazan-directed Tea and Sympathy where he played Tom Lee, a "sissy" cured by the right woman. He was praised for the role, and after it closed, he turned to Hollywood once more, starring in Friendly Persuasion (1956) with Gary Cooper and Dorothy McGuire, which earned him the Golden Globe Award for Best New Actor of the Year and a nomination for the Academy Award for Best Supporting Actor. Rushes of the film led to Perkins landing a seven-year, semi-exclusive contract with Paramount Pictures. He was their last matinee idol.

Although Friendly Persuasion earned him much praise, Perkins solidified himself as a powerful actor in Fear Strikes Out the following year, which caused many to name him "the next James Dean" and "the greatest American actor under thirty." However, Paramount was more concerned with heterosexualizing Perkins's image, which led to a string of romantic roles alongside Audrey Hepburn, Sophia Loren, and Shirley MacLaine. He was able to score the occasional serious role in the Broadway play Look Homeward, Angel (for which he was nominated for a Tony Award) and the 1959 film On the Beach with Gregory Peck, Fred Astaire, and Ava Gardner. Although he was once again cast as a romantic lead in Jane Fonda's film debut, Tall Story, he was shortly thereafter cast as Norman Bates in Alfred Hitchcock's Psycho (1960), which established him as a horror icon and garnered him a Bambi Award nomination for Best Actor, as well as both a Best Actor nomination and a win from the International Board of Motion Picture Reviewers. His acclaimed work in the 1960 horror-thriller also led to his being typecast, and in order to escape the same villainous roles, as well as the homophobia he was being subjected to, Perkins bought himself out of his Paramount contract and fled to France, where he debuted in European film with Goodbye Again (1961). Even when paired with Oscar-winning actress Ingrid Bergman, he still distinguished himself as a talented performer, and the film earned him a Best Actor Bravo Otto nomination, a second career Bambi nomination, as well as his winning the Cannes Film Festival Award for Best Actor and a Best Actor David di Donatello award.

After a string of European films featuring the likes of Sophia Loren, Orson Welles, Melina Mercouri, and Brigitte Bardot, Perkins returned to America in 1968 with his first American film after an eight-year hiatus, Pretty Poison. He costarred with Tuesday Weld, and the film became a cult classic. In the film's wake, he starred in numerous commercially and critically successful films, such as Catch-22 (1970), Play It as It Lays (1972), Murder on the Orient Express (1974), and Mahogany (1975), the latter of which broke box-office attendance records. During this time, Perkins went through conversion therapy and married Berry Berenson in 1973. He also conceded to typecasting, starring in Psycho II (1983), Psycho III (1986) and Psycho IV: The Beginning (1990). His turn in the 1986 entry of the anthology earned Perkins a Saturn Award nomination for Best Actor. Additionally, he was involved in numerous television excursions. His last film, In the Deep Woods, was a television film broadcast a month after his death in September 1992 from AIDS-related causes.

Early life

Before his father's death, 1932–1937

Perkins was born April 4, 1932, in Manhattan, the son of stage and film actor Osgood Perkins (1892–1937) and his wife, Janet Esselstyn (née Rane; 1894–1979). His paternal great-grandfather was wood engraver Andrew Varick Stout Anthony. Perkins was also a descendant of Mayflower passengers John Howland, Myles Standish and William Brewster as well as Roger Conant. Through an entirely paternal line he was descended from John Perkins, who arrived in Boston from England in 1630 as part of the Puritan migration to New England.

Throughout his early years, Perkins did not see much of his father, who was busy in a variety of film and stage roles. The most prominent of these was his supporting role in the original motion picture adaptation of Scarface, which was released the year Perkins was born. Perkins's only fond memories of his father came from a 1937 vacation to Fire Island, although they did little together on the trip. During this time, the Perkinses hired a French nanny, Jeanne, to look after their son. This led to Perkins becoming fluent in French, which would be useful years later when he moved to France.

Between his father's absences, Perkins was often surrounded by a feminine presence, the most insistent of which was his mother. "I became abnormally close to my mother," Perkins recalled to People in 1983, "and whenever my father came home I was jealous. It was the Oedipal thing in a pronounced form, I loved him but I also wanted him to be dead so I could have her all to myself." On September 21, 1937, Osgood Perkins died of a heart attack just after a successful opening night of his newest play, Susan and God. His death caused Perkins to feel intensely guilty. "I was horrified," he said years later. "I assumed that my wanting him to be dead had actually killed him. I prayed and prayed for my father to come back. I remember long nights of crying in bed. For years I nursed the hope that he wasn't really dead. Because I'd see him on film, it was as if he were still alive. He became a mythic being to me, to be dreaded and appeased."

After his father's death, 1937–1947

After his father's death, Perkins was surrounded entirely by women once again. Besides his mother, a consistent female companion in Perkins's life was burgeoning playwright Michaela O'Harra, whom his mother had taken a liking to. Perkins's childhood friend, John Kerr, recalled about the relationship between O'Harra and Perkins's mother: "My mother said–I don't know if she used the word lesbian... but that was just [what it felt like] to me: 'Oh, they're having a lesbian relationship.' You know, something like that." Although her sexuality has been disputed, it is widely agreed that Perkins's mother was not heterosexual. It was also during this time that Perkins's mother began to sexually abuse him. "She was constantly touching me and caressing me. Not realizing what effect she was having, she would touch me all over, even stroking the inside of my thighs right up to my crotch." This behavior continued on into his adulthood.

In 1942, when Perkins was ten, the family uprooted and moved to Boston. Due to her connections in the theatre industry, Janet was able to gain a position at the nearby American Theatre Wing's Boston Stage Door Canteen. Janet managed much of the canteen's activities, and the job gave them money to live off of. On days when she was busy, Perkins was sent to stay with his grandmother. Under his mother's neglect, Perkins began to rebel at the overcrowded public school he was attending, and he was soon labelled a "gifted drifter." To quell his rebellious habits, Janet shipped him off to Brooks School, forty minutes outside of Boston. The placement was disastrous: Perkins's childhood habit of stuttering returned again and he shied away from all athletics. Janet, however, forced him into baseball. It was the first time in his life where Perkins was overwhelmingly singled out for being "different." The pressure bore down on him, leading him to leave school in long absences during his second year after he came down with back-to-back cases of scarlet fever. Subsequently, Perkins sunk to the bottom of his class in grades. Perkins soon made a deal with his mother that if he got good grades, she would allow him to return to Boston the next year for schooling. That year, Perkins ranked in the top third of his class and inspired his headmaster to comment, "Tony Perkins is considerably more mature than the rest of his contemporaries, and is impatient with many of their schoolboy interests," and he was allowed to transfer.

Summer stock, 1947–1950
It was during this time that Perkins's absence of a father began to bear down on him again. "As Tony grew older and saw other boys with their fathers," Janet remembered, "he badly missed his own father. And the only identification he could have with his father was through theater... I began to realize that he was acquiring an unusual interest in [performing]... A friend was running a summer stock company, and I approached him to ask whether Tony might play some small parts." This launched Perkins's adolescent summer stock career. The first summer stock company Perkins played for was at the Brattleboro Summer Theater in Vermont, where he portrayed some minor parts in the plays Junior Miss, Kiss and Tell, and George Washington Slept Here, and manned the box office. This earned him both twenty-five dollars a week and an Equity card.

Keeping her word, Janet sent Perkins to another school the following year named Browne & Nichols School. At the time, it was an all-boys school located in Cambridge, with a high percentage of football players and overly-masculine types. With smaller classes, Perkins stood out more, leading him to earn a reputation as the class magician and piano player. He was also renowned for his lisping Roddy McDowall impression, which he often performed in the halls between classes. 

In summer 1948, Perkins again returned to summer stock, this time under a different company. Janet had found a job as a manager for the Robin Hood Theatre in Arden, Delaware, where Perkins once again manned the box office and earned stage experience. His most memorable performance was in Sarah Simple where he played a near-sighted twin, though it was at the Robin Hood Theatre that Perkins first met Charles Williamson, the first boy he ever developed a crush on. The following school year, Perkins dove into academic activities. He joined the varsity tennis team and the glee club, and was made co-literary editor of the school paper, The Spectator. Occasionally, he contributed articles. It was around this time that Perkins began to question his sexuality. Once again, Perkins felt singled out as the "other."

College, 1950–1953

Around the time Perkins's sexuality began to burgeon, many of his fellow students were thinking about college. Many Browne & Nicholas alums were looking forward to a future at Harvard University, and Perkins, whose grades were too low to qualify, was the only student persuaded to attend Rollins College when a representative toured the school. However, this did not keep him from returning to Delaware that summer, where he once again worked at the Robin Hood, which was now one of the most prosperous and important summer stock programs in the country. It was there where he grew reacquainted with old friend Charles Williamson, going out to lunch with him and swimming together during breaks. It was at this time that Perkins developed a crush on Williamson, who recalled, "He never expressed his homosexuality during the summer of 1950. He did not act on it at all. At the time, I was very much in the closet and repressed. We both shared that." It was also around this time that Perkins played Fred Whitmarsh in the play Years Ago, who he'd perform again just a few years later in the screen adaptation.

Perkins did not experience a similar camaraderie at Rollins College that fall. Known as a Christian all-American school, Rollins College was nestled in the heart of Florida, and Perkins had arrived just after Congress had named homosexuals and Communists enemies of equal danger. There were a few exceptions: Fred Rogers, who would graduate the college the following year, let Perkins use his piano, something Perkins greatly appreciated. Perkins appeared in numerous stage productions at the school and moved around fraternities constantly, something which got on the nerves of Janet. It was at Rollins that Perkins reportedly first started experimenting with his sexuality and other men.

Shortly after Perkins's arrival, a large group of homosexual students, many of whom were Perkins's friends, were expelled from Rollins and even arrested after a fellow student beat one of them. However, due to Perkins's connections with the theater professor, he was spared. This only led to high levels of tension between him and the rest of the students, who now knew of Perkins's sexuality. This later led Perkins to transfer to the elite Columbia University.

Career

1950s

Film and Broadway debut 
While still attending Rollins College, Perkins went out to California over summer vacation, hoping to make it into the movies. Having heard that MGM was making a screen adaptation of Years Ago, he lingered on the lot, hoping a casting director would spot and test him. As Perkins later recalled:

It was later that summer that Perkins learned he had been cast as Fred Whitmarsh in the film, now renamed The Actress (1953), alongside Jean Simmons and Spencer Tracy. He was also directed by George Cukor, who was a friend and collaborator of his late father. In the film, he played a fumbling Harvard student who chases the interest of Ruth Gordon Jones (Simmons), who wants to perform onstage despite her family's disapproval. The film was a commercial disappointment, although it scored an Academy Award nomination for Best Costume Design.

Perkins was first noticed when he replaced John Kerr on Broadway in the lead of Tea and Sympathy in 1954, where he was directed by the legendary Elia Kazan, who had been a friend of his father's. In the play, he took on the role of Tom Lee, a college student who is labelled as a "sissy" and fixed with the love of the right woman, in an almost autobiographical role. Perkins said years later, "It was the best part ever written for a young guy. I felt so involved with that particular play. In many ways, I was Tom Lee." Although homophobically written and resolved, the play was the only explicit work to hit Broadway depicting homosexuality and garnered a large gay following, therefore establishing Perkins in the gay-dominated theater world. It was through this audience that the production became a success, and many people thought Perkins was substantially better than his predecessor, John Kerr, who went on to play the role in the film adaptation. Joan Fickett, who played Perkins's love interest in the play, commented, "He was that boy. I'd seen John Kerr do it before, but Tony had a quality that was fantastic for the part–all the rawness and the hurt and the confusion, he just had. I found his performance tremendously poignant." The play's success and Perkins's tremendous performance renewed Hollywood interest in him.

According to posthumous biographer Charles Winecoff, it was during the production of Tea and Sympathy that Perkins was drafted despite (or perhaps because of) the recent end of the Korean War. Without consulting anybody, he decided to tell the Selective Service he was a "practicing homosexual," which was an eligible way to be deemed unfit for service, rather than enter the military. Reportedly, this had disastrous results, leaving Perkins traumatized.

Serious roles

Just as his run in Tea and Sympathy was coming to an end, director William Wyler sent out his assistant, Stuart Millar, to search out talent on Broadway for his upcoming film, Friendly Persuasion. It centered around a bristled family of Quakers during the Civil War, and he was scouting an actor to play the oldest of the Birdwell children, Josh. When Millar saw Perkins in Sympathy, he gave him a page of script and let him to an audition. As Millar recalled: "About half a hour later, [Perkins] had the part. [William Wyler] was thrilled with the reading, he saw everything instantly. It was really one of the best, if not the best, readings I've ever seen."

Perkins was soon after shipped out to Hollywood, where he began shooting alongside Dorothy McGuire and Gary Cooper, his screen mother and father. Perkins, a native New Yorker, did not know how to drive yet and regularly hitchhiked out from his hotel room at the Chateau Marmont to the set each day, something which became infamous and often talked about in fan magazines. His boyfriend, Tab Hunter, later taught him how to drive. Perkins's inexperience radiated almost childish naïveté, something which endeared him to Gary Cooper. "Coop was warm and gracious and kindly," Peter Mark Richman, who worked on the film, said. "He liked [Perkins and me] a lot, and Tony loved to hear him talk." The feeling was mutual between Perkins, Cooper, and even the director. Perkins was regularly praised by Wyler for his performance and Cooper began publicly endorsing Perkins's abilities. This led to Perkins and Cooper sharing the cover of the July 1956 issue of Life. In the issue, Cooper spoke about Perkins in a fatherly manner: "I think he'd do well to spend a summer on a ranch," he commented about his younger costar. "It would toughen him up and he'd learn a lot from another kind of people." Cooper's daughter, Maria Cooper Janis, asserted that, although her father certainly admired Perkins, it could have also been for other reasons: "He had friends in Hollywood, in the acting community, who were gay, and they couldn't come out. He saw what an emotional toll it took on them. I know my father adored Tony Perkins. My father felt he was a hell of an actor."

Whatever the reason, this did not alter Perkins's performance. After rushes of the film were shared around, the advance praise of his performance became so strong that Paramount Pictures took an interest in him. They soon after signed him under a seven-year semi-exclusive contract, which gave him room to return to Broadway whenever he wanted. He was their last matinee idol and was called the "fifteen million dollar gamble."

Perkins's first film for the studio was a 1957 biopic about Boston Red Sox baseball player Jimmy Piersall entitled Fear Strikes Out. It followed his father's pressure to become a legendary baseball player and how it led to his highly publicized mental breakdown, as well as detailing his efforts to get better in a mental institution. The set of the film was hostile and riddled with homophobia, something which put Perkins on edge so much that the cast and crew feared he was actually having a mental breakdown while filming the scene. Although he wasn't nominated for any Oscars, his performance was widely praised by critics. The Hollywood Reporter proclaimed of the film: "Every recent young star has been compared to James Dean. From now on the standard is Tony Perkins."

After this critical success, Perkins starred in the first of two Westerns, The Lonely Man (1957), with Jack Palance. Perkins played Riley Wade, whose father, Jacob (Palance), abruptly returns to his life after having abandoned his mother years before. Jacob fights with Riley's hatred for him throughout the film, desperate to reconnect with his estranged son after years of separation. Kim Stanley, a previous costar of Perkins's, was originally cast as his love interest but was replaced last-minute by Elaine Aiken in her film debut. Reportedly, the film set was riddled with tensions, most of which spawned from Palance's ultra-masculinity and Perkins's lack thereof. This was only heightened when filming was put behind schedule by an abrupt weather crisis that prevented outdoor production for a number of days. Still, a feeling of vitality remained. "We all thought this was an important picture we were making."

Perkins's next film was also a Western, this time named The Tin Star (1957) with Henry Fonda. Originally, despite his burgeoning popularity, Perkins was not wanted for the project: "The producers, Bill Perlberg and George Seaton, told someone who told someone who told someone who told me that they wouldn't have me in their picture for a million dollars," Perkins admitted during filming. However, he auditioned for them as soon as he heard the news. In the film, Perkins played yet another pacifist, this time a sheriff named Ben Owens. After encountering an experienced bounty hunter, Morgan Hickman (Fonda), Ben has to prove himself worthy of his title in an ironic reflection of Perkins's troubles with Paramount. Perkins and Fonda took the hours-long drive out to set together in the same car, during which they became closely acquainted and shared stories of their private lives. Some cast members speculate that Perkins confided in Fonda about his sexuality during these drives. The film grossed over $1 million in the box office and was one of the biggest films of 1957. It is now considered a classic of the Western genre.

At this time, Friendly Persuasion opened globally to huge critical and commercial success. The film was largely praised by critics, who took a liking to Perkins. The film earned him the Golden Globe Award for Best New Actor of the Year and a nomination for the Academy Award for Best Supporting Actor. In a cover story in 1958, Newsweek hailed Perkins as "possibly the most gifted dramatic actor in this country under 30."

Teen idol status

Perkins released three pop music albums and several singles in 1957 and 1958 on Epic and RCA Victor under the name Tony Perkins. His single "Moon-Light Swim" was a moderate hit in the United States, peaking at number 24 on the Billboard Hot 100 in 1957. 1958's "The Prettiest Girl in School," though a flop in the United States, was also popular in Australia. Many people believed he was inspired to pursue musical endeavors after the abrupt success of then-partner Tab Hunter, who had scored a number one hit on his debut record, "Young Love." To Hunter, Perkins was often heard joking "that his tremulous voice could make any happy love song sound sad." However, Perkins was not very committed to the music career, although he steadily produced full-length albums and a few EP's until as late as the mid-1960s.

Despite being a life member of the Actors Studio and therefore open to many different acting business ventures, Perkins did not choose to act in a musical when he exerted the freedom of his studio contract in 1957 and returned to Broadway in Look Homeward, Angel. The play was an autobiographical coming-of-age story about its writer, Thomas Wolfe, and he took on the role of Eugene Gant, with his mother being played by Jo Van Fleet. The play enjoyed a successful run, and in 1958, he was nominated for a Tony Award for Best Actor in a Play, although the rehearsals were tumultuous. Van Fleet developed a reputation for her standoffish behavior and temper tantrums, leading to contention on the set. This was not made better by the fact that Tab Hunter, among others, came to see the show during tryouts. This manifested itself in a restrained performance from Perkins, something Hunter picked up on:
Backstage, Tony asked what I thought of his performance, and I told him straight: "You're afraid to give vent to what you're truly feeling," I said. "You're only showing the side of yourself you want other people to see."... When I saw Look Homeward, Angel the second time, in late January, Tony had stripped away all preconceived ideas and was mesmerizing.

Not all was bad on set, though. Perkins, who had a dressing room far from the stage, often had to race between scenes in order to retrieve something so as not to miss his cue, something his costars utilized in practical jokes. Many times, they turned the backstage area into an obstacle course, seeing if Perkins could get back to the curtain in time. Reportedly, he never missed his entrances. On the day of his final performance, they went through with the prank as planned, watching Perkins leap over objects and dodge barriers. Once he made it through, he was greeted with a sign that said "We love you, Tony!"

Perkins was teamed up again with Van Fleet in This Angry Age (1958), also known as The Sea Wall, for Columbia, replacing James Dean (Van Fleet had played Dean's mother in East of Eden, something many people believed influenced casting). The story followed a mother who, unlike her restless children, attempts to cling onto her dissipating rice farm in southeast Asia. He also starred Desire Under the Elms (1958) for Paramount with Sophia Loren and was her first American screen kiss. As Loren remembered in her 2014 memoir, "Perkins [was] as neurotic and handsome as we all remember him in [a later film] Psycho. A gentle, polite, somewhat sullen young man, he didn't know how to hide his restlessness. Between us there was a certain complicity. He helped me with my English, and I tried to make him laugh." Although Loren was proud to have scored the role, the unanimous decision upon its release was that Perkins came off weakly.

Between the filming of Desire and his next movie, Perkins received an offer to appear in what would become the 1959 comedy Some Like it Hot with Marilyn Monroe. He was given the role of Shell Oil Junior and Frank Sinatra was considered for the role of his companion who both dress up in drag in order to board an all-women train car. Paramount, despite the appeal of a big star like Monroe, balked at the idea of having their already sexually-ambiguous heartthrob wear drag for an entire film and forbade Perkins from accepting the role. It ultimately went to Tony Curtis instead. However, studio executives begged Perkins to return from Broadway to star in The Matchmaker (1958) alongside Shirley MacLaine and Shirley Booth, during which he and a male companion dress up in women's clothing in order to escape a restaurant undetected. As if to ensure he would not turn the project down, Perkins was given a salary of $75,000 for ten weeks' work while MacLaine only got $25,000 for the same number of days. Although Perkins protested MacLaine's smaller salary, no changes were made in terms of her payment.

The Matchmaker was a non-musical film adaptation of Thornton Wilder's stage play, where Dolly Gallagher Levi (Booth) attempts to set up rich businessman Horace Vandergelder (Paul Ford) with a younger woman, Irene Malloy (MacLaine). Vandergelder's employees, Cornelius Hackl (Perkins) and Barnaby Tucker (Robert Morse), tired of their poor wages and constant work, escape to New York City and meet Irene, who's led to believe Cornelius is rich. Cornelius slowly falls in love with Irene while deceiving her. Morse had been a part of the original Broadway cast of the show, and he bonded with Perkins over the shared background. (Perkins would later disclose that Morse was bisexual, implying that they became confidants of sorts.) Perkins, however, intensely disliked MacLaine even after defending her from studio bosses and was put on edge by her intense drive and numerous pranks. "I've never been allowed that precious moment of seeing what Tony Perkins really is," MacLaine later reported. "I don't know what's an act and what isn't an act."

Paramount decided to take Perkins's status as a teen idol one step further and cast him as Audrey Hepburn's love interest in Green Mansions (1959), one of Hepburn's few flops. It was based on an explorer who stumbles upon both a girl who lives in the woods and the Native Americans nearby who want to kill her. The film was originally intended to be a vehicle for Elizabeth Taylor when the project was initially announced in 1953, though those plans were soon after abandoned. In 1958, Mel Ferrer picked the film up for MGM, and Hepburn (his wife) was cast as the mystical Rima to secure funding. Perkins, who was still stinging after being forced to lose the role in Some Like it Hot, was cast soon after. It would be the only film in which Ferrer would direct his wife.

Perhaps still remembering the Some Like it Hot incident, Paramount used the film to promote Perkins's dwindling masculinity, showing him shirtless and exerting his "ability" to kill men visually stronger than him. He did receive a reprieve to sing "Green Mansions," the title song of the film which briefly entered the charts before almost immediately falling off. Speaking about the movie later in life, Perkins said, "[Hepburn] was wonderful to work with, like a real person, almost a sister... [The film] was good but unusual."

Perkins's next film, On the Beach (1959), however, did little to promote his teen idol status, and was his last serious film before his legendary Psycho performance later that year. He played a doomed father living in Australia after a nuclear war wipes humanity off all other continents. He supported legendary actors such as Gregory Peck, Ava Gardner, and Fred Astaire in his first dramatic role. All filming took place in Melbourne on-location over the course of three months, and a soundstage was made out of a warehouse for the crew's use. Unlike other films, Perkins got on well with his fellow cast members and even helped Astaire prepare for his serious scenes. Years later, in an infamous interview with People, Perkins would list Gardner as the first of many female stars who tried to put the make on him, although due to his sexuality, he very cautiously declined.

Perkins's next several roles were less serious. His next film, Tall Story (1960), was best remembered for being Jane Fonda's film debut, and he had to play a college basketball champion. As a man who had never been talented in sports, he had to be trained to play basketball for his performance, but, unlike his teachings on the set of Fear Strikes Out, the lessons were able to stick. Perkins recounted to reporters, "I've been working out at the Warner Brothers gym, discovering what basketball is all about. I spend about an hour and a half a day dribbling, passing, shooting baskets, and going after rebounds... It's a good game. Like chess in a way." Also unlike Fear Strikes Out, the set of Tall Story was hospitable to him from what he could see. Since Perkins had already worked with her father, he and Fonda had a connection, though not many could foresee the chemistry they would have both on- and off-screen. As Fonda later recounted to Patricia Bosworth, "Tony [Perkins] told me, 'Forget about the lights, just forget about the lights.' And I did. And he taught me fascinating things, like the audience's eyes always move to the right side of the screen so you should always try to get on the right side of the set." Fonda also credits solely Perkins for helping her learn how to play before the camera when acting.

In a repeat of On the Beach, Fonda also developed a crush on Perkins. Perkins would later recall a moment when she sat in his dressing room, completely naked, powdering her body. Fonda, unlike others, was actually understanding of his homosexuality and became good friends with whomever he was seeing at the time. Behind the scenes, however, there was more turmoil: Fonda would recall, "Both Joshua Logan [the film's director] and I were in love with Tony Perkins, and so that caused a problem."

1960s

Troubles with Paramount 

After being signed in 1955, Perkins became Paramount's last matinee idol, and he was promoted relentlessly as that image through a string of leading man-roles on screen. Once he had finished three films for the studio, they had already invested $15 million in him before any of the motion pictures were even released. This would begin the infamous tension between Perkins and Paramount.

Another reason for tension came from Perkins's side: he believed Paramount was ruining his career. Although he was given the option to do Broadway performances, his fame primarily stemmed from his performances on-screen, where Paramount was pushing him into leading-man roles. Perkins, however, wanted only to be a serious actor, not a teen idol. Their preoccupation with keeping Perkins's masculinity intact also led to him losing quite a few coveted roles, such as Shell Oil Junior in Some Like it Hot and Tony in West Side Story.

Paramount president Barney Balaban strongly disliked Perkins due to his homosexuality. They constantly had arguments, mostly revolving around his sexuality and ongoing relationship with fellow actor Tab Hunter, which Balaban believed Perkins flaunted too much. He constantly pressured Perkins into breaking up with Hunter and going into conversion therapy for the five years Perkins was under contract with the studio. A later collaborator of Perkins's remembered to Charles Winecoff in 1996, "Tony said one thing that always endeared him to me... that when he was a rising young star at Paramount, he was seeing a great deal of [Tab Hunter], they went around town together, and finally the big studio head called him in and said, 'You cannot do this anymore. We're going to make you a star, and you can't be seen around town with this guy. You've got to get a girl, you've got to stop seeing him.' Tony replied, 'But I love him!"—which left the studio head speechless—and walked out". Hunter remembered a similar scenario: "Warner Brothers never said a word about my sexuality, and that's just the way I wanted it. However, Paramount did have something to say about my relationship with Tony, and they told him they didn't want him to see me anymore... Despite the opposition we did continue seeing each other."

According to all accounts, Perkins, until 1959, withstood Balaban's threats of expulsion and even protected his homosexuality from his studio boss. It was not until between filming Tall Story and Psycho that the studio executives succeeded in separating Perkins and Hunter, which many believe was a major factor into Perkins buying himself out of his Paramount contract early, just like Hunter had done at Warner Brothers.

Psycho and Greenwillow 

Perkins in youth had a boyish, earnest quality, reminiscent of the young James Stewart, which Alfred Hitchcock exploited and subverted when the actor starred as Norman Bates in the film Psycho (1960). Hitchcock would later say that he'd had Perkins cast ever since seeing him in Friendly Persuasion. The motion picture was about Marion Crane (Janet Leigh), a young woman who steals forty thousand dollars from her work and flees to the Bates Motel, run by Norman Bates (Perkins), where she is murdered in her room's shower. The film culminates with the revelation that Bates's mother has been dead for ten years and that Bates has been dressing up and even assuming her personality. This leads him to murder all young girls he's attracted to, including Marion, under the "Mother" personality.

During filming, Perkins was involved in the 1960 Broadway musical Greenwillow, written by Frank Loesser. The plot followed the magical town of Greenwillow, where the men are meant to wander and women (if they can keep their husbands) are supposed to settle down and have children. Despite his call to isolation, Gideon Briggs (Perkins) wants to marry his sweetheart, Dorie (Ellen McCown). Loesser caught onto Perkins' homosexuality fast and, disliking him for it, decided to upstage him, writing his main solo, "Never Will I Marry", as something reminiscent of an opera ballad. However, close friend Stephen Sondheim praised his performance of "Never Will I Marry": "[Perkins was] wonderful. One of the things that makes 'Never Will I Marry' so brilliant [on the recording] is the crack of his voice when he reaches the tenth." The show's director, George Roy Hill, also called Perkins "remarkably good. It didn't have the timbre of a real Broadway voice, but it didn't have the hard edge. 'Never Will I Marry' was a wonderful example of that." Additionally, the song was later popularized due to its renditions by Judy Garland, Barbra Streisand, and Linda Ronstadt. Perkins was also nominated for another Tony Award for Best Actor in a Musical.

Psycho was made on a slim budget, with Perkins and Leigh accepting low salaries for their roles and the crew being reused from Alfred Hitchcock Presents. The film was nonetheless a critical and commercial success, and gained Perkins international fame as he won the Best Actor Award from the International Board of Motion Picture Reviewers. The role and its multiple sequels affected the remainder of his career.

European films 

After buying himself out of his Paramount contract, Perkins moved to France and began making European films, the first of which was Goodbye Again (1961) with Ingrid Bergman, which was shot in Paris. It centered around a May-December romance. Paula Tessier (Bergman) tries to resist the charms of Philip Van der Besh (Perkins), who is the son of one of her clients, while stuck in an unfulfilling affair with a cheating businessman (Yves Montand). It was originally entitled Time on Her Hands, although Perkins suggested the English title Goodbye Again after one of his father's plays. Once again, Perkins found himself subjected to the romantic attention of his female costar, although he customarily declined. Despite any off-screen tension this might have caused, Perkins's role in the film was greatly praised and earned him the Cannes Film Festival Award for Best Actor.

Perkins returned briefly to America to appear in a short-lived Broadway play, Harold (1962), though returned to Europe shortly thereafter. He was then cast in Phaedra (1962), shot in Greece with Melina Mercouri and directed by Jules Dassin, which was undoubtedly inspired by Mercouri's recent success in Never on Sunday. It was a modern retelling of a Greek tragedy where Alexis (Perkins) falls in love with Phaedra (Mercouri), who is also his stepmother. When asked about Perkins, Mercouri fondly said, "Ah, Tony. He is attractive to women. He is dangerous to women. When you touch him, he goes away a little. He is an [eel]. Raf Vallone [who played Perkins' father and Mercouri's husband in the film] is a good-looking man, but Perkins... Ah, I'd pick Perkins any time." Perkins' role in the film was also met with praise.

His next film was Five Miles to Midnight (1962), which was his second motion picture with Sophia Loren. It follows Lisa (Loren), who believes her husband Robert (Perkins) died in a plane crash. When he reveals he is still alive, he urges her to instead collect the life-insurance money from his death. The film was a major shift away from the romantic leads he'd played in Goodbye Again and Phaedra and leant more toward his Psycho persona. Filming began under the title All the Gold in the World, and Perkins reportedly only signed onto the picture after hearing Loren had replaced the previously cast Jeanne Moreau as his coerced wife. The production process was captured on video for the documentary The World of Sophia Loren, where she and Perkins can be seen laughing between takes, practicing scenes, solving puzzles, and singing the popular "After I'm Gone" (ironically, Tab Hunter had covered the song in 1958). The film was a moderate success.

Perkins continued with his mentally disturbed performances in Orson Welles' version of The Trial (1962), based on the Kafka novel about Joseph K, a man who's arrested and attempts to figure out what his crime is and how to defend himself. Perkins did not mind the typecasting as long as he was able to work with Welles, who personally wanted him to play the lead. To discuss the possibility of Perkins taking on the role, the two met on the stairs of Welles's hotel. Perkins remembered, "[Welles] paid me the great compliment of saying he would like to know whether I would make the picture because if I wasn't going to make it, he wasn't going to make it either." It is likely Welles was trying to make his runaway hit like Psycho, but even if that was the purpose, Perkins did not seem to mind. "He's the best there is," Perkins said of Welles. "He's wonderfully sure of himself and his ability without being dictatorial and autocratic about it... [H]e isn't inflexible." The film quickly went over-budget, although this did little to alter Perkins's vision of his director. In fact, during the process of filming, his admiration for Welles only seemed to stiffen: during filming, he even considered writing a book about Welles and his career, even going as far as to carry a tape recorder in his coat pocket for weeks, though he abandoned it in fear of offending his boss. Welles later said to Perkins, "Oh, why didn't you [do it]? Why didn't you? I would have loved it!"

Besides Perkins' abandoned plan to write a book about Welles, there was genuine affection between the two. Later in life, Welles remembered Perkins fondly: "A strange thing happened with [The Trial]: it got wonderful press, all over the world, even in America. Even in Time and Newsweek and everything, wonderful press. And Perkins got very bad press, all over the world, and the entire blame for that is mine, because he is a superlative actor and he played the character that I saw as K, and paid the price because nobody else sees it my way... I recognize that I did Tony–who is one of the best actors we have–a great disservice, because he deserved to have made a tremendous success and if he didn't with the critics the blame is one hundred percent with me." Despite any regrets Welles might have had with his portrayal of Perkins and his character, the film was a massive success and later became a cult classic. Welles stated immediately after completing the film: "The Trial is the best film I have ever made". It was the first of four collaborations between Perkins and Welles.

His final disturbed role before another romantic motion picture was in Le glaive et la balance (1963), shot in France. It had a very insignificant impact. His next film, however, would be in Une ravissante idiote (1964) with Brigitte Bardot, which was a comedy. It followed a Russian spy (Perkins) who employs a gorgeous but dim-witted woman (Bardot) as his accomplice in procuring secret documents. Perkins made history as the first American actor to play B.B.'s love interest, although Perkins would later openly admit Bardot was his least favorite costar, calling her "Bardot-do-do." Bardot was another woman on Perkins's roster of suitors, although Perkins always denied Bardot's invitations to her penthouse. Perkins was incredibly uncomfortable around Bardot,  which was drastically different from his behavior around his previous (older) costars.

After Une ravissante idiote , Perkins shotThe Fool Killer (1965) in Mexico. An art film, the motion picture followed a 12-year-old boy (Edward Albert) who wanders the Civil War-ravaged South with a philosophical axe murderer (Perkins), and was Perkins's second film to about the American civil war. The film was well received but not overly popular at the box office, and Perkins returned to France for a cameo in Is Paris Burning? (1966), a war film about the liberation of Paris in 1944 at the hands of the French Resistance. This was his second Welles collaboration and reunited him with director René Clément, who had had the same occupation over Perkins in 1957's This Angry Age. In addition, Perkins' friend, Gore Vidal, wrote the script.

Return to the United States 

Even though he was still living in France at the time, in 1966, Sondheim began writing a horror musical Evening Primrose, which was set to be aired on ABC Stage 67, for Perkins. Perkins returned to America to star in the musical alongside Charmian Carr, who was fresh off her success in The Sound of Music. The plot followed Charles Snell, a struggling poet who decides to live in a department store by night and pretend to be a mannequin by day. He encounters a secret society, the Dark Men, that already had the idea, and falls in love with Ella Hawkins (Carr), who is the maid of the society's leader and is forbidden from speaking to Snell. If they attempt to leave the department store, the Dark Men will kill them and turn them into mannequins. Sondheim referred to it as one of his favorite musicals he ever wrote, and announced Perkins as the lead of Company  shortly thereafter. Perkins, however, withdrew from the role, though he would remain something like a muse for Sondheim for quite a few years.

After his return to American television, Perkins appeared on Broadway in the Neil Simon play The Star-Spangled Girl (1966–67). For a brief moment, he was able to once again shed his typecast role as a mentally disturbed man, instead playing a radical roommate vying for the attention of a young woman. Among his costars was Connie Stevens, and although they were both offered compliments for the performances they salvaged from the source material, the play was not on the whole well received. Neil Simon later commented that The Star-Spangled Girl "was written 'from an emotional identity rather than personal identity... I knew this one didn't have the body of the others. I knew it never had a chance to be a powerful comedy... I didn't make it'". Shortly thereafter, Perkins returned to his beloved Europe and he starred in another French film, The Champagne Murders (1967), for Claude Chabrol. The film was well-received, with the New York Times saying, "Mr. Chabrol... has made a film that has the shape and structure of a murder mystery, but which is, essentially, a funny, sardonic social drama." Despite this, it was insignificant in the box office.

Perkins made his first Hollywood movie since Psycho, Pretty Poison (1968) with Tuesday Weld, where he was typecast in the role of a psychotic young man for a fifth time. The plot revolved around Dennis Pitt (Perkins), a man who is on break from a psychotic hospital on parole who meets Sue Ann Stepenek (Weld). He tells her he is a secret agent and they go on "missions" together, culminating in their attack on a factory. This was the first of two films with Weld, whom he had dated in the early 60s, and they were reportedly chilly but respectable to each other on set. It wasn't a box office success and Weld labeled it as her worst film, but has become a notable cult favorite.

1970s

Shift to supporting roles 
In the 1970s, Perkins moved into supporting roles in Hollywood-feature films. The first of such motion pictures was 1970's Catch-22, playing Chaplain Tappman. This was followed by a brief appearance in WUSA (1970), starring Paul Newman and Joanne Woodward. Off-Broadway, he appeared in and directed Steambath (1970).

After that, Perkins shifted his focus away from movies briefly to star on the made-for-television film How Awful About Allan (1970), where he once again played a psychotic character, this time opposite gifted and acclaimed leading ladies Julie Harris and Joan Hackett. Although the film was hardly a significant work at the time of its release, it eventually gained a minor cult following over the years, thanks in large part to the film's eventual ubiquity as a result of the film entering into the public domain, making it more and more available and accessible for future audiences to see. He returned to motion pictures soon after, assisting Charles Bronson in the French crime drama, Someone Behind the Door (1971), playing yet another mentally disturbed man. This was also an insignificant endeavor.

It seemed that Perkins could not escape his murderous image on screen, especially after he starred in Chabrol's murder mystery Ten Days' Wonder (1971), his third film with Orson Welles. It was also the third film where he fell in love with his step-mother (after 1958's Desire Under the Elms and 1962's Phaedra) in an odd twist of fate. Perkins was reunited with another one of his older costars when he supported Tuesday Weld in Play It as It Lays (1972), based on the Joan Didion novel. It follows Maria (Weld), a washed up model who pursues a meaning in life beyond her dull marriage. She is friends with B.Z. (Perkins), a closeted producer who is being paid by his mother to also remain in a loveless marriage. For both stars, their roles were almost autobiographical, resulting in stunning performances. The Chicago-Sun Times praised, "What makes the movie work so well on this difficult ground is, happily, easy to say: It has been well-written and directed, and Tuesday Weld and Anthony Perkins are perfectly cast as Maria and her friend B.Z. The material is so thin (and has to be) that the actors have to bring the human texture along with them. They do, and they make us care about characters who have given up caring for themselves." Weld received a Golden Globe for her role, and both actors were expected to be nominated for Academy Awards. Neither were. However, Perkins would publicly label the film as being his best performance.

Perkins changed genres for his next film, The Life and Times of Judge Roy Bean (1972). In the movie, he plays a wandering minister who assists the title character (Newman), following him as he causes mayhem in the town. This was his second film with Paul Newman and his only film with ex-partner Tab Hunter, whom Hunter later recalled he bumped into at the Tucson location:
"We hadn't seen each other in nearly ten years... What I didn't know at the time of our brief union was that Tony's long-running battle with his personal demons had reached a breaking point. He was ending a long relationship with dancer Grover Dale and had started therapy with Mildred Newman... Newman convinced Tony that his personal problems stemmed in large measure from him being gay, and she prescribed a course of action–including electroshock therapy–to turn him straight."

According to Perkins himself, he had his first heterosexual experience on the set of the film with costar Victoria Principal.

Sondheim-Perkins collaborations and unconventional roles 

In 1973, Perkins reunited with close friend Stephen Sondheim to co-writeThe Last of Sheila, a 1973 American neo noir mystery film directed by Herbert Ross. It was based on the games Perkins and Sondheim made up together and revolved around a movie producer who tries to discover who murdered his unfaithful wife by taking his rich friends on a maze through exotic locations, each with a piece of gossip applying to one of the other people aboard a yacht. The characters were influenced by people Perkins and Sondheim knew in real life: The film was a commercial success, and led to Perkins and Sondheim sharing the Edgar Allan Poe Award for Best Motion Picture Screenplay, which led them to try to collaborate again two more times. The next project was announced in 1975, entitled The Chorus Girl Murder Case. "It's a sort of stew based on all those Bob Hope wartime comedies, plus a little Lady of Burlesque and a little Orson Welles magic show, all cooked into a Last of Sheila-type plot", said Perkins. He later said other inspirations were They Got Me Covered, The Ipcress File and Cloak and Dagger. They had sold the synopsis in October 1974. At one point, Michael Bennett was to direct, with Tommy Tune to star. In November 1979, Sondheim said they had finished it. However, the film was never made. In the 1980s, Perkins and Sondheim collaborated on another project, the seven-part Crime and Variations for Motown Productions. In October 1984 they had submitted a treatment to Motown. It was a 75-page treatment set in the New York socialite world about a crime puzzle. Another writer was to write the script. It, too, was never made.

Perkins was one of the many stars featured in Murder on the Orient Express (1974), adapted from a popular Agatha Christie novel. He played the suspicious McQueen, and was reunited with previous costars Ingrid Bergman (1961's Goodbye Again) and Martin Balsam (1960's Psycho), as well as being teamed up with legendary actors like Lauren Bacall. The picture was a massive box office smash, the 10th-highest-grossing film of that year, a hit with critics, and was nominated for six Academy Awards, including a third (and final) career win for co-star Bergman. Also in 1974, Perkins co-starred with Beau Bridges and Blythe Danner in Lovin' Molly, a drama film directed by Sidney Lumet. It had a budget of over $1.2 million and was relatively well received.

He enjoyed success on Broadway in Peter Shaffer's 1974 play Equus (where he was a replacement in the leading role originally played by Anthony Hopkins). In the show, he played a psychiatrist who attempts to rid his patient of their unnatural obsession with horses, shedding his stereotypical performance as a mentally disturbed man. His role was received to rave reviews, perhaps some of the best of his Broadway career. He continued with his stage work and directed the Off-Broadway production The Wager (1974), which had an insignificant impact.

Perkins returned to film supporting Diana Ross in Mahogany (1975), where he played a photographer bent on making a young model (Ross) into a star. Perkins and Ross were good friends on set, to the point where Perkins's wife joked about them running off together, though this did not expel any strain from production. Perkins's photographer character, Sean, was rewritten shortly before filming began to capitalize on his Psycho persona. This was made worse by the fact that the once explicitly gay character was now simply queer-coded, as well as being written in a homophobic way. It was because of this and other factors that Perkins thought the film was mediocre, though it performed well at the box office, setting attendance records shortly after its release.

Continuing in the vein of comedy appearances, Perkins hosted television's Saturday Night Live in its first season in 1976. During his hour-long special, he poked fun at his serious image, crying out for his "good-luck panties." He briefly addressed the audience during his opening monologue, thanking them for seeing "the real Tony Perkins," before launching into a skit about Norman Bates's School for Motel Management, reprising his infamous role from Psycho. He also played a singing psychiatrist (perhaps influenced by Equus, something also mentioned in his opening monologue) and a victim in numerous pretend horror films. Towards the end of the program, Perkins posed and chatted with The Muppets.

Two years after his SNL appearance, Perkins co-starred with Geraldine Chaplin in Remember My Name (1978). Perkins plays the husband of his real-life wife, Berry Berenson. Perkins's character is besieged by his ex-spouse (Chaplin) who has just been released from prison and is bent on getting him back. Director-writer Alan Rudolph described it as "an update of the classic woman's melodramas of the Bette Davis, Barbara Stanwyck, Joan Crawford era." The motion picture was surprisingly popular and well-received, with the San Francisco Chronicle giving the film 4 out of 5 stars. They also praised both Perkins's and Chaplin's performances as "extraordinary."

After Remember My Name, Perkins had more roles on television, playing Mary Tyler Moore's husband in First, You Cry (1978), a biographical drama film based on the 1976 autobiography of NBC News correspondent Betty Rollin recounting her battle with breast cancer. The film was nominated for numerous awards, including the Golden Globe Award for Best Motion Picture Made for Television and numerous Primetime Emmys. In 1979, it was parodied on an episode of SNL with a sketch entitled "First He Cries." It follows a husband (Bill Murray) who's distraught over his wife's (Gilda Radner) mastectomy. The sketch was poorly received, resulting in over 200 calls and 300 letters of complaint.

After the modest success of First, You Cry, Perkins continued on his television streak when he played Javert in Les Misérables (1978) based on the famous 1,000-page novel about the June Rebellion, opposite Richard Jordan as Jean Valjean. He projected a more kid-friendly light when he was featured in Walt Disney's mammoth science fiction epic The Black Hole in 1979, where he reunited with crew members from Fear Strikes Out, whom he hadn't seen in twenty-two years. The film would also develop a large cult status with sci-fi fans, and was nominated for Academy Awards for Best Cinematography, as well as a nod for its complex and groundbreaking visual effects.

Shortly thereafter, Perkins returned to the boards in another Broadway success with Bernard Slade's 1979 play Romantic Comedy, who was the famed author of Same Time, Next Year. He played playwright Jason Carmichael who meets Phoebe Craddock (Mia Farrow) and falls in love with her, and they decide to work together on a production. The show was a wild success and ran for 396 performances. The New York Post wrote: "A darling of a play... zesty entertainment of cool wit and warm sentiment."

1980s 
Perkins was a slick, unrelentingly-psychotic villain in the 1980 action film North Sea Hijack (also known as Assault Force and, for many, it is better known as ffolkes) co-starring opposite Roger Moore, and one of 
the many names appearing in the all-star cast of Winter Kills (1980), a dark comedy about geo-politics and presidential assassinations. The film starred the likes of Jeff Bridges, John Huston, Richard Boone, Eli Wallach, Dorothy Malone, Toshiro Mifune, Belinda Bauer, Elizabeth Taylor, and, in a bit part as a morgue attendant, Perkins' real-life wife Berry Berenson. The film was a box office bomb, losing more than $4 million. Like so many other Perkins films, this picture has, too, also earned itself a cult following.

After Winter Kills he also starred in the 1980 Canadian film Deadly Companion (also known as Double Negative) opposite Michael Sarrazin, Susan Clark, Kate Reid, and in a very small role, a soon-to-be famous comic actor named John Candy, with whom Perkins got on well on-set. It was largely disregarded by the public and even more so by critics. The attention it did receive was bleak, save for some kind remarks for Perkins. Spies and Sleuths called the movie "a muddle film that cannot untie its tangled skein of a plot, although a Perkins performance is always worth watching." Another nice review for Perkins came from Starburst: "This convoluted thriller is not without its merits (not least some clever dialogue and well observed performances by, among others, Anthony Perkins.)"
Perkins reprised the role of Norman Bates in Psychos three sequels. The first, Psycho II (1983), was a large box office success 23 years after the original film, competing with films of the likes of Trading Places and WarGames, as well as a string of other screen sequels, including Return of the Jedi, Superman III and Jaws 3-D, among others. Psycho II followed Norman Bates's life after being released from a mental institution he resided in for more than two decades.

Later that same year, former partner Tab Hunter met Perkins at his Mulholland Drive home, accompanied by the latter's wife and children, asking him to star in Lust in the Dust. Lust was a Western and spoof of Duel in the Sun, and Hunter's love interest would be played by drag performer Divine, whom he had already caused a stir with in John Waters's Polyester. Hunter's partner and future husband, Allan Glaser, who was a producer on the film, requested that Perkins should play the villain Hardcase Williams, something Hunter believed was influenced by the sudden success of Psycho II. Glaser knew nothing of Hunter's past with Perkins. "I tried to convince him to [do the film]," Hunter remembered, "...but he denied I choose not to think about the reasons for his turning down what would have been a wonderful role. When Tony and I said good-bye that afternoon, I was sincerely happy for him... It would be the last time we ever saw each other."

After turning down Lust, Perkins went to Australia to appear in TV mini-series For the Term of His Natural Life in 1983. The show was produced in three-parts, with an overall runtime of 6 hours, following an educated, adventurous British aristocrat Richard Devine. The show was well received by critics, becoming the eleventh highest rated Australian mini series on Sydney television between 1978 and 2000, with a rating of 37, and the third highest on Melbourne television with a rating of 45. After that was The Glory Boys (1984) for British television, a thriller miniseries with Rod Steiger. There was an intense dislike between Perkins and Steiger after the latter received a larger trailer, and Steiger labeled Perkins as "so jittery and jinxed by the chemicals he was taking."

Following his feud with Rod Steiger on the set of Glory, Perkins found a more hospitable movie set when he made Crimes of Passion (1984) for Ken Russell. The film centered around a minister who attempts to rid a sultry woman of her sexual ways, but the movie was proved so explicit that it retained an X-rating for its first cut. The motion picture was majorly edited and received an R-rating instead. Although Perkins believed the editing ruined the film, it has become a cult favorite. He then starred in and directed Psycho III (1986), in which Norman Bates falls in love with a tragic wayward nun who comes to the Bates Motel. Perkins' performance in this entry of the Psycho series earned him a Saturn Award nomination for Best Actor. The film, however, ultimately proved to be less successful (both critically and commercially) than its predecessors. This led to bouts of diminished self-confidence, though it did not mark the end of his directorial career.

After the disappointment of Psycho III, Perkins returned to television and had a supporting role in Napoleon and Josephine: A Love Story (1987), based on Napoleon Bonaparte's romance with Joséphine de Beauharnais, where Perkins played diplomat Talleyrand. The show was poorly received, but was nominated for two Emmys.

Perkins drastically changed genres for his next project, the slasher film Destroyer (1988), where he once again had a supporting role. Perkins was praised for his role, but the overall film was deemed a disappointment. Perkins disappeared briefly from the screen, directing but not appearing in the comedy Lucky Stiff (1988), which was a humorous take on cannibalism and incest. While a box office failure, the film developed a cult following due to its quotable dialogue and exposure in Fangoria, who did a feature on the film.

1990s 
Following his directorial pursuit, Perkins starred in additional horror films, including Edge of Sanity (1989), Daughter of Darkness (1990), and I'm Dangerous Tonight (1990). He found a reprieve while filming the pilot for the light-hearted show The Ghost Writer about a horror novelist named Anthony Strack (Perkins) who is haunted by his deceased wife after he remarries. The pilot ended with Perkins finishing the manuscript of his next novel, which was based on a supernatural encounter he had with the ghost of his wife. The pilot never sold. He gave in to typecasting and played Norman Bates again in the made-for-cable film Psycho IV: The Beginning (1990). His first son, Oz Perkins, made his film debut in the prequel as a young Norman Bates. It was on the set of this film that Perkins learned he was HIV-positive.

Perkins appeared in six television productions between 1990 and 1992 while privately battling with AIDS, including Daughter of Darkness (1990) and hosting a 12-episode horror anthology series titled Chillers (1990). He made his final appearance in In the Deep Woods (1992) with Rosanna Arquette, which was released posthumously. All of these appearances tied back into horror, further solidifying the typecast role he had fallen into.

Missed roles 
 Perkins was offered the lead role in Dancing in the Checkered Shade, a John Van Druten play. "I had little money and was practically set for Dancing in the Checkered Shade," Perkins recalled in 1956. "My agents were split in their decisions. New York said I should stay and do the play. Hollywood said I should come out and do [Friendly Persuasion]. It was like flipping a coin. So I took the picture." Dancing never made it to Broadway, while Friendly Persuasion earned Perkins an Academy Award nomination and Hollywood stardom.

 Perkins tried out for the lead in East of Eden and Rebel Without a Cause, both of which went to James Dean. There were rumors that Perkins's East of Eden loss led Elia Kazan, the film's director, to give Perkins the role of Tom Lee in Tea and Sympathy, the Broadway play he was directing, though Kazan himself dismissed those notions as "bullshit." (Perkins, however, would be chosen over Dean for Friendly Persuasion and replaced him after his death in This Angry Age.)
 Perkins was optioned as the lead in Harold Robbins's A Stone for Danny Fisher, but he was not interested in the film and turned it down. It would later be known as King Creole, a musical vehicle for popular teen idol and pop singer Elvis Presley, whom Perkins was sometimes mistaken for.
 Perkins was offered the role of Shell Oil Jr. in the 1959 comedy Some Like it Hot with Marilyn Monroe, which Monroe was reportedly excited about. Perkins, however, was forced to decline the opportunity by Paramount Studios executives, who did not want Perkins, who was already sexually ambiguous, in drag for a film.
 Perkins, just as he was signed onto the commercially, critically, and culturally significant Psycho, was encouraged to take the title role in a 20th-Century Fox biographical film, Dooley, who just happened to be gay. Tea and Sympathys Robert Anderson wrote the script, and Greenwillows George Roy Hill and Tall Storys Joshua Logan had expressed an interest in directing the film. Jack Lemmon and Montgomery Clift were also strong contenders for the main role. Perkins, however, was not allowed to audition after Paramount balked at the production cost. 
 Perkins was seriously considered for the role of Tony in the 1961 adaptation of West Side Story, although Paramount forced Perkins to rescind his audition as well. This instead would plant the seeds of Perkins's lifelong friendship with West Side Storys writer, Stephen Sondheim.
 Perkins was the first choice of Tennessee Williams and the play's director, Tony Richardson, in the 1963 Broadway revival of Williams's play The Milk Train Doesn't Stop Here Anymore with Tallulah Bankhead. As Tab Hunter remembered, "Tony [Perkins] suggested me to Richardson after a scheduling conflict kept him from playing the part. This gesture meant the world to me... but in a very classy move, neither Richardson nor Perkins ever let on that I wasn't the first choice. It would be many years before I learned the truth, too many to be able to thank my old friend." The show, partly due to the then-recent assassination of United States president John F. Kennedy which kept people inside, closed after three performances.
 Perkins was cast as Robert, the lead role, in the Stephen Sondheim-penned Company, which Perkins declined due to scheduling conflicts. Later in life, Perkins attributed his refusal to anxiety as well: "I had signed up to do the lead in Company and suddenly this specter rose up in front of me–of performing again for a year and a half–and I dreaded it." Some people also believed his refusal was because Robert was a seemingly flamboyant character.
 Perkins, after cowriting the script of the movie with Stephen Sondheim, was encouraged to take the role of Clinton, the lead antagonist, in The Last of Sheila (1973). Sondheim was one of the major supporters of this casting, seeing Perkins as perfect for the role. Perkins, however, thought it played too much into his already-established deranged persona and passed it up to James Coburn instead.
 Perkins played a horror writer, Anthony Strack, in the television pilot for the show The Ghost Writer, which Perkins was enthusiastic about in terms of its prospects, believing it would be the perfect way for him to transition into more comical roles on both stage and screen. The pilot never sold.
 Perkins agreed to provide the voice for the role of the dentist, Dr. Wolfe, in The Simpsons episode "Last Exit to Springfield", but died before the part could be recorded. The character was voiced by Simpsons regular Hank Azaria.

Artistry

Influences
Perkins, having grown up in New York as the son of a theater performer, was heavily influenced by stage actors in the early stages of his interest in acting. Slowly, however, his influences shifted, especially with the new wave of Method actors on the big screen. In 1958, Perkins admitted to Holiday magazine that the single performance that he believed had impacted his acting the most wasn't off the boards: "The single performance which influenced my own acting the most was [Marlon] Brando's in On the Waterfront... That's the direction I want to go as an actor. To convey the maximum with the simplest, barest means." He also mentioned James Dean later on: "Well, I was certainly impressed with the originality of [Dean's] talent. Of course, it was popular at the time of his emergence."

Perkins himself was a lifelong member of the Actors Studio, an institution both Brando and Dean attended as well, which could have contributed to his interest in the Method. Perkins's posthumous biographer, Charles Winecoff, though, dismisses any ideas that Perkins was a Method actor himself: "Young Perkins fell somewhere in between the mannered style of his father's era and the new, seemingly organic style exemplified by Brando and Dean."

To cite one person as Perkins's influencer would be incorrect. Especially in his early years, Perkins took advice from a host of his costars, a majority of whom were experienced and revered actors in their own right. The most influential of his fellow stars were Gary Cooper and Henry Fonda.

Acting style
Despite his many celebrated performances, Perkins never discussed the method with which he acted. Many said he was somewhere between his father's style of acting (building a character from the outside in) and the Method technique (building a character from the inside out). Recalling how he prepared for his mental breakdown scene in Fear Strikes Out, Norma Moore said he was especially "serious, very intent, very nervous before shooting...–pacing, not talking to anybody, shaking his hands." The film's director, Robert Mulligan, said that Perkins was "riding on instinct, very giving and very trusting and very brave." A year later, when Perkins played Eugene Gant for Broadway in Look Homeward, Angel, not much had changed. "His approach was a purely pragmatic one," friend George Roy Hill remembered. "He'd find a way to play it, and he had no theories to get in his way. I don't know what devices he used internally, but he was always very concerned with acting as acting."

There is evidence to suggest that Perkins used previous (sometimes traumatic) experiences to drive his performance. During his debut run on Broadway in Tea and Sympathy, Perkins was allegedly drafted into the army, which he dodged by admitting he was a homosexual. This backfired, leading to harsh mistreatment at the hands of the Selective Service that reportedly scarred him so much he wouldn't speak about it. His boyfriend was there when he returned home, listening to him crying and whimpering. He later said that Perkins incorporated the same whimpering into his performance as Tom Lee in Sympathy. Perkins, though, never hinted at this in a rare mention of his technique when speaking about the scene in Friendly Persuasion when Josh Birdwell decides to enlist:
"That scene started [filming at] about 9:30 in the morning and by 1 o'clock the unions at that time declared that we had to go to lunch, right in the middle of the scene–just before my close-up. And [William Wyler, the director] came to me and said, 'I'm really sorry about this. You're doing a fabulous job and I want you to hold onto this if you possibly can. Why don't you go back to your room and sort of concentrate and reread the script? I'm very very sorry; we'll start again in an hour.' Well, I went to the commissary and had two cheeseburgers and a malted and came back and sat down and started over again. I didn't have the self-consciousness as an actor to find that that would be a difficult thing to do, so since I didn't think it was gonna be difficult, it wasn't... Well, youth can do anything."

Either way, it worked. Many of Perkins's films distinguished him as a powerful actor of the day, garnering numerous awards and nominations. As Turner Classic Movies summarized: "A masterful character actor, Perkins' ability to convey mental instability in a fashion that was simultaneously disturbing, affecting, and darkly humorous made him a unique and valuable talent."

Public image

Persona

Throughout his career, Perkins often played shy, sensitive young men. Whether this was the morally-split Josh Birdwell or the unconfidently homicidal Norman Bates, they all distinguished him as one of the rare male actors unafraid to be vulnerable with the audience. "He was supposed to be gawky, you know," costar Jean Simmons recalled, "with the sleeves too short and all that stuff." Former partner Tab Hunter spoke similarly about Perkins: "Beneath the boyishness, however, there was a lot of tension–not news to anyone who's seen Tony on-screen. The familiar body language wasn't an act. He slouched around with his hands shoved deep in his pockets, and he jiggled his foot unconsciously–a nervous twitch."

Despite his well-documented habits, the authenticity of them has been challenged by some of Perkins's friends and colleagues. Alan Sues, who worked with Perkins on Tea and Sympathy, noted, "You know, if you play that kind of sensitive, I-don't-know-if-I-can-get-through-this sort of thing, people come to you. His approach was that he was suffering, that stuff was going on inside of him, and I don't think it was. His strong suit was knowing how to project an image." Although Hunter expressed similar doubts ("I began to wonder how much of his sheepish appeal was genuine," he wrote in 2005, "and how much was manufactured, used to mask very calculated, methodical intentions"), he did believe overall that Perkins was dealing with a lot of backlash from Paramount over his sexuality, which therefore led him to become as brooding as he was.

However real or fake the mannerisms were, they caught on in the press, which had a field day when Perkins, who didn't know how to drive, was photographed hitchhiking to the set of Friendly Persuasion. He was often described as "boyish" by fan magazines, and his odd habits, from the way he dressed to the meals he ate, were written about in detail. Photoplay called Perkins a "barefoot boy with cheek" in a 1957 issue, while later portraying him as an embarrassed singer when they photographed him during recording sessions. Perkins seemingly played into this quirky yet insecure persona, venting to McCall's: 
"I'm not really suited to be a movie star. I have no confidence in myself. I'm not interested in money. I'm not good-looking. I have a hunch in my spine. I can't see worth a damn. I have a very small head. I haven't many opinions. I dislike nightclubs–the kind of things that give you easy publicity. I have no string of French girls. I'm not tough. I can't put on a show in public. I'm much too sensitive for Hollywood. I'm an easy target."

He also did so on game shows. As a mystery guest on the popular television program What's My Line?, in an affected Australian accent, Perkins responded to a question asking if he was a movie star by saying, "That's a term I don't like." After his identity was revealed to the panel of previously blind-folded guessers, Perkins was asked again why he didn't prefer the term. "The term movie star," he said, "implies a certain glamor which I believe I lack."

Even if some people found Perkins's constant complaining about his self-esteem to be annoying, it did earn him fans in the more prominent gossip columnists. Both Louella Parsons and Hedda Hopper were fans of him, feeling an almost maternal instinct for him. "[Hopper] was the biggest Tony Perkins fan in town," Tab Hunter recalled. "She practically declared him her adopted son in print and was eager to publish anything that would bury those rumors about Tony's 'secret friend' [a euphemism for Hunter and their secret relationship often employed by the press]." This also endeared him to Academy Award-winning costume designer Dorothy Jeakins, whom he worked with on Friendly Persuasion and Green Mansions. "He had a gift for inciting maternal instinct, particularly in mature women."

Sex symbol and teen idol
Perkins was relentlessly promoted by Paramount Pictures as a sex symbol and teen idol throughout his career, something Perkins saw as a sacrifice to his serious acting prospects. They forced him through a succession of romantic lead roles, whether they were beside relative unknowns like Norma Moore and Elaine Aiken or powerhouses like Sophia Loren and Audrey Hepburn. Although he was depicted in drag in The Matchmaker with Shirley MacLaine, Perkins's image in these films was largely heterosexualized, no matter how feminine Perkins appeared. Despite his 140-pound stature, Perkins delivered a shirtless performance in both Desire Under the Elms and Green Mansions where his ribs are visible through his skin, if only to accentuate his "masculinity." This compulsive and brash heterosexualization ended up being detrimental to Perkins's career, costing him the leads in both Some Like it Hot and West Side Story.

Even if the masculinity of Perkins's image was forced, his beauty was not. As friend Gwen Davis remembered, "He was intellectually dazzling, physically beautiful. At twenty-four, he was already Dorian Gray." Costar Joan Fickett spoke similarly of Perkins: "Tony had a quality that was fantastic... He was also a beautiful-looking young man." Even his post-Hollywood friends like Melina Mercouri agreed: "He was the most intelligent and the most beautiful actor that I played with. He was extremely generous [and gorgeous], a gentleman."

Perkins's popularity as a teen idol was increased by the plentiful stories circulating about his active dating life. Although they ultimately ended up stumped as to how an attractive star such as Perkins could remain a bachelor, Perkins was constantly "losing his heart" to somebody, whether it was Natascia Mangano or Elaine Aiken. Perkins was often claimed to be "infatuated" with many of his leading women, whether they were married or not. Soon, Perkins's dating life became as prominent as his career, something Perkins was deeply irritated and annoyed by.

Another source of teenage frenzy around the young actor was his singing career. Although his highest-ranked single in the United States, "Moonlight Swim," peaked in the 20s on the Billboard charts, his albums were still popular with teenage fans. Many of his songs centered around forbidden romances, something an adoring fan could relate to since they might have seen a potential romance with Perkins, a "movie star," as forbidden. Many of the songs often described the love interest as young, with two ("The Prettiest Girl in School" and "When School Starts Again Next Year") explicitly stating that his "girlfriend" was young enough to still be in school. These singles came out shortly before the release of 1960's Tall Story, where Perkins played a college student, amplifying the teenage frenzy tenfold.

Personal life

Marriage
There are many conflicting answers as to how Perkins met his future wife, photographer Berinthia "Berry" Berenson, the younger sister of actress and model Marisa Berenson. There were stories that it was at a party in Manhattan in 1972, while some insist it was on the set of Play It as It Lays. The one sure answer was that it was in 1972.

Although not romantically, Perkins and Berenson saw each other often even though she was engaged to Richard Bernstein at the time. Slowly, the attachment became romantic and then sexual, leading Berenson to become pregnant out of wedlock. After telling her fiancé this, Bernstein reportedly reacted by telling Berenson that Perkins was gay and didn't reciprocate her feelings. Berenson was said to have replied, "No, he's going to Mildred Newman and he wants to be straight! He wants to be straight!" Berenson left Bernstein the same day.

Perkins and Berenson married when he was 41 and she was 25, on August 9, 1973, with Berenson three months pregnant. Their first son, actor and director Oz Perkins, was born in 1974, and musician Elvis Perkins followed two years later in 1976. Many friends were surprised by this marriage and believed it would not last long. Venetia Stevenson admitted to Charles Winecoff, "[I]t was a big shock when I heard [Tony] got married. [I went,] not Tony. He was very gay, totally gay." Even Berenson admitted some reserves:
"A lot of people looked at the two of us and said, 'Who are they kidding? This is never going to work.' I was so naïve I couldn't figure out what they were talking about. He told me [that he was gay], and it just didn't register. I had been very sheltered."

Despite this, Perkins and Berenson remained married until his death.

On September 11, 2001, as Berenson was returning to her California home from a vacation in Cape Cod on American Airlines Flight 11, her plane was hijacked and crashed into North Tower of the World Trade Center, killing everyone aboard. She died at the age of 53, one day before the ninth anniversary of Perkins's death.

Sexuality
Rumors about Perkins's sexuality had persisted since the beginning of his career, when he made his Broadway debut in Tea and Sympathy playing a gay character. Posthumous biographer Charles Winecoff linked him with a mass expulsion of gay men at Rollins College in Florida, where he was an undergraduate, claiming a large group of his friends had been arrested on charges of homosexuality but that Perkins's links to the theatre professor saved him from dismissal. However, there is no evidence of this besides the interviews Winecoff conducted with Rollins alumni.

Perkins reportedly had his first experience with a woman at age 39 with actress Victoria Principal on location filming The Life and Times of Judge Roy Bean in 1971. He was in therapy with psychologist Mildred Newman, whom Stephen Sondheim later described to author Mark Harris as "completely unethical and a danger to humanity." In his 2021 biography of Mike Nichols, Harris wrote that "Perkins and his longtime boyfriend, Grover Dale, had both become convinced that their homosexuality was obstructing their happiness and wanted to restart their lives with women," adding that Newman and her husband–partner Bernard Berkowitz "clung to the belief that male homosexuality was a form of arrested development, and made a small fortune convincing willing clients that it was an impediment to getting what they wanted." When interviewed for a 1999 documentary on Perkins, friend and collaborator Sidney Lumet said, "I [asked him why he went into therapy and] said, 'Well, how about you?' [He said,] 'I'm a homosexual...' From then on, he spoke about it completely openly, and I remember when... he said that period of his life was over with, and I said, 'Well, how come, Tony? How did it happen?' And he said, 'I just didn't want it anymore.'"

Many friends, partners, and colleagues have consistently said Perkins was homosexual rather than bisexual. This is due to the fact that, up until this point, Perkins had only homosexual relationships and expressed little interest in women. However, Perkins noted in 1983 that his mother and her sexual abuse might have had something to do with it: "She was constantly touching me and caressing me. Not realizing what effect she was having, she would touch me all over, even stroking the inside of my thighs right up to my crotch." This behavior continued on into his adulthood. This reportedly led to Perkins "being unable to see a beautiful woman," but many costars and collaborators remembered situations where he would gawk and drool over a woman walking down the street. Tab Hunter has since called moments like these a ruse: "You always saw what Tony wanted you to see, which was kind of sad in many ways... An actor plays a role, and pretty soon he takes on that persona. And we're all guilty of having done that. I think perhaps Tony's persona was the persona that he wanted people to see. There's nothing wrong with that, but there's that fine line of knowing how to divorce yourself from yourself."

Therapy with Mildred Newman
In 1971, Perkins ended a seven-year relationship with dancer Grover Dale for unknown reasons, after which he turned to friends Paula Prentiss and Richard Benjamin for help. Both encouraged him to see up-and-coming psychoanalyst Mildred Newman, whose recent self-help book How to be Your Own Best Friend was rising up the New York Timess bestseller list. Their meetings became thrice weekly, and sometimes Perkins would engage in group appointments. He later became one of Newman's most vocal celebrity supporters. Perkins's posthumous biographer, Charles Winecoff, wrote: "Newman's therapeutic shtick that it was okay to love yourself without guilt and get the happiness and (mostly) the success that you naturally deserve seemed to be rubbing off on Tony."

That same year, Newman had written in How to be Your Own Best Friend that "analysts once thought they had little chance of changing homosexuals' preferences and had little success in that direction. But some refused to accept that and kept working with them, and we've found that a homosexual who really wants to change has a very good chance of doing so."

Later in life, Perkins referred to Newman as an almost peaceful person, "a crusader for a wider road, for choice and limitlessness." This, though, is not reflected much in Newman's actions or the sparse recollections Perkins related about their meetings. Sometimes their discussions would end in weeping spells, especially after Newman asked Perkins to imagine himself having sex with a woman. "'Why are you crying?' [Newman] asked. 'I don't know,' Tony answered. 'It's so sad, so sad.'" Other times, they were simple arguments: "She was constantly provoking me about women, asking why I was repressed in that area. We had heated disagreements, knockdown arguments. I would say, 'I don't want to talk about this again today,' and she said, 'I do want to talk about it.' We kicked it to pieces." After Perkins's death, Stephen Sondheim publicly labeled Newman and her practices as "completely unethical and a danger to humanity."

It has been widely reported that Perkins began visiting Mildred Newman with the wish of turning heterosexual. However, that is not the case. In a 2022 interview, Perkins's ex-partner, Grover Dale, said:

"Tony and I were meeting with Mildred Newman, a psychologist. ... Within weeks, Tony, Anita [Morris, Dale's wife], and Berry Berenson [Perkins's wife], who was a photographer at the time, were all living together in the same house, okay? And Anita and I lived down in the garden apartment, Tony and Berry lived in the upper duplex, and we were these four people, and all of our friends thought we were crazy, that we were being brainwashed into these relationships. I married Anita first; within three weeks, Tony and Berry were married... It's not wanting to [hide our relationship]. It's political issues."

Relationships
According to the posthumous biography Split Image by Charles Winecoff, Perkins had exclusively same-sex relationships until his late 30s, including with actor Tab Hunter, artist Christopher Makos, and dancer-choreographer Grover Dale. Perkins has also been described as one of the two great men in the life of French songwriter Patrick Loiseau.

Relationship with Tab Hunter, 1955–1959

Tab Hunter publicly admitted to his relationship with Perkins in his 2005 autobiography Tab Hunter Confidential: The Making of a Movie Star, having met him at the Chateau Marmont during the filming of Friendly Persuasion in 1956: 
"I went for a swim and when I came out my friend Venetia Stevenson said, 'Oh I want you to meet Tony – do you know him?' We hadn't met, but I already knew that he was a very fine actor. He was at Paramount and I was with Warner Brothers. We just chatted and got on and soon we were starting to see each other."

Their relationship went on for four years and had its ups and downs. A few months after their relationship began, Perkins announced to Hunter that Paramount had cast him as Jimmy Piersall in Fear Strikes Out, a role Hunter had originated on television and was trying to convince Warner Brothers to introduce on the screen. Hunter, however, stated that even after the incident, "we continued to see each other, privately, as much as our schedules allowed." This included a multi-week stay together in a private villa in Rome in March 1957 and an appearance on Jukebox Jury that May.

During their relationship, Paramount Pictures constantly targeted Perkins for their romance. Many people reported arguments between the studio heads and Perkins, many revolving around Hunter and their relationship. Hunter, however, notes that for many years this had no effect on how they treated each other within their relationship, calling it "a wonderful time in my life." Despite this, Paramount succeeded in separating the couple in 1959, just before Psycho went into filming. After their separation, Perkins and Hunter did not see each other more than twice in the thirty-three years until Perkins's death. The first time was on the set of The Life and Times of Judge Roy Bean in 1971, the only film Perkins and Hunter starred in together. The second was at Perkins's home in 1982 when Hunter tried convince Perkins to play the villain in Hunter's upcoming film Lust in the Dust, costarring Divine. They nearly spoke a third time in 1992, as Hunter remembered: "I had a hunch to call [Perkins after hearing he was very sick with AIDS] and touch base, and when I picked up the phone, I heard on the radio that he'd passed away." Hunter later told The Advocate that watching himself speak about Perkins's death was one of the most impactful moments of his 2015 documentary.

In addition, he remembered Perkins as a "special part of my journey. If he was shooting a film, I'd pick up a car and drive out to see him and we'd spend time together... He wanted to be a movie star more than anything. I wanted that too, but not with the same kind of drive he had. We were such opposites - but then maybe that was the attraction."

Relationship with Grover Dale, 1964–1971

Perkins and Dale met during rehearsals for the Frank Loesser musical Greenwillow, in which Perkins played the lead. Dale was an ensemble member, dancer, and Perkins's understudy. Their relationship began on the set of the musical. Stanley Simmons, who worked on the production's costumes and lived next-door to Perkins in New York, confirmed, "Tony never said anything, but he was having an affair with Grover." Tony Walton, another actor in the show, agreed the two were involved, "but they were discreet. It wasn't a big deal. Folks were aware of it, and [Tony and Grover] didn't shove it." Allegedly, rumors of the relationship were rampant backstage. Posthumous biographer Charles Winecoff claimed they did not live together at the time, while Dale himself said only a few months passed between them beginning their relationship and him moving into Perkins's apartment. The apartment Perkins and Dale shared was, at the time, his only residence in the United States.

By late 1964, posthumous biographer Charles Winecoff asserts that Dale had become "Perkins's main man" and that he was often spotted walking down the New York City streets with Perkins, walking his dog Punky. By Dale's own admission, they were still together in 1966; the same year, Winecoff describes Perkins's relationship with Dale as "soaring back home." Perkins and Dale were a visible couple, hosting parties for people such as Jerome Robbins and Elaine Stritch, which often ended in an intense match of Scrabble. There were other instances where Winecoff described Perkins and Dale as being "married" to each other, and friend Ben Bagley asserts that Perkins "whispered [the song 'I Cling to You' from Bagley's album] as if he was speaking it to Grover, which he informed his lover of afterward." Christopher Makos, a friend of Perkins's, said of the relationship: "I can't speak for Grover, but these were two adult men who probably loved each other very much." By 1969, just as the Stonewall riots kicked off the movement for gay rights, Perkins and Dale were considered "role models" for other gay professionals looking to have open relationships. Dale was considered one of the major loves of Perkins's life.

Friendships

Throughout his time in Hollywood, Perkins worked with a host of famous personalities, many of whom remembered him fondly. Among his costars and leading ladies, there was usually mutual endearment. Sophia Loren remembered Perkins's dressing room for 1958's Desire Under the Elms as looking like a monk's cage, and she was often photographed smiling and laughing with him when they reunited in Europe a few years afterward. In the press, Perkins discussed how his main objective while making 1959's Green Mansions was only to make Audrey Hepburn laugh every day, and Elaine Aiken recalled that Perkins would often divert her attention away from her plate on "dates" so he could steal some of her food. "I don't think we ever discussed [him being gay, which Aiken knew about], it didn't matter," she recalled. "It didn't bother me. I just wanted a friend." A similar bond was forged between Perkins and Venetia Stevenson, to whom he would "unburden" himself. "[Perkins] would sleep over and tell me sad stories," Stevenson told Tab Hunter. "He was totally crazy about you." She also mentioned to biographer Charles Winecoff, "We were real friends, and he would sleep over at my house [which was a block away from Perkins and Hunter's apartments] in the same bed. But there was never, ever any... well, you know. If you have a friend of the opposite sex who's gay, it's just in the air. You know what I mean?"

Although he got on famously with women, he also had many friendships with men. Despite Alfred Hitchcock's infamous saying that "actors are cattle," he got along well with Perkins on the set of Psycho. Hitchcock accepted many of Perkins's ideas for the character of Norman Bates, including the suggestion that he should nibble on candy corn. Even after Perkins moved to France, he was a common addition to Hitchcock's dinner table. Perkins was also a favorite of Orson Welles, whom he collaborated with four times.

Perhaps the most famous of his male friendships was with Stephen Sondheim, whom he briefly lived with for a time. Since penning Evening Primrose for Perkins, which would end up being the only project of Sondheim's Perkins actually starred in, Perkins became a muse to him, inspiring many musicals, where Sondheim cast him in all the leads. Perkins, however, turned all of these down, mostly due to scheduling conflicts. When discussing Perkins and the process of writing The Last of Sheila together, Sondheim said, "I knew he had exactly my mind and take and he's much more into murder mysteries than I am, so we started to plot it. We spent a couple of months plotting it, and had such a good time we decided to go ahead and write it. I think the most fun I've ever had writing anything was writing [The Last of Sheilas] screenplay." Sondheim was later named the godfather to both of Perkins's children and was present at Perkins's final birthday party.

Character and interests
Perkins was largely remembered by friends and associates as being a shy, neurotic young man, with the ability to be very alluring. Bruce Jay Friedman, a later collaborator of Perkins's in the production Steambath, remarked, "He was enormously charming, but also very controlled. He always seemed to have four ideas going on in his head at once." Mary Tyler Moore, who worked with Perkins on the hugely popular First, You Cry TV movie, remembered Perkins similarly: "He was a charming person, a very keen actor who seemed to love his work... He was just a nice guy, and not what I had expected at all. I had expected him to be arch and very sophisticated and stylish–and I'm sure he was all those things–but that's not what you most remembered about him."

Although former partner Tab Hunter remembered Perkins similarly, he was more open about acknowledging the complexities of Perkins: "You never really knew Tony a hundred percent. He was a bit of a game player with people's minds." However, he also saw Perkins as being a multi-layered, realistic person with flaws: 
I don't think many people really knew Tony well. He had friends. A lot of people liked him, but he had few friends that he really confided in. I don't know for sure what he was really like. You always saw what Tony wanted you to see, which was kind of sad in many ways... He was a wonderful guy, and he had a very funny, very dry sense of humor.

In our society everyone wants to know everything about everybody 100 percent. And you never really knew everything that was going on with Tony. It was still water that ran pretty deep.

Perkins's shy, introverted personality attributed itself to many of his interests, most of which were one-man activities. Since he was a young boy, he was often preoccupied with books and adored reading. When asked, he playfully admitted he was a lover of science fiction, though he could not stand brooding philosophical books. This went hand-in-hand with his interest in writing, which he indulged in throughout life. While at Browne & Nichols School, he was made co-literary editor of the school paper, The Spectator, to which he occasionally contributed articles. This interest would even make its way into his professional life, when Perkins cowrote The Last of Sheila with Stephen Sondheim years later. It would be the only time he wrote a screenplay, as Perkins reflected years later, "Acting was just memorizing lines, and I was good at that. Writing was harder and required more work."

However uninterested in interaction Perkins was, his interests were not solely solitary. Perkins was an avid fan of the board game Scrabble, and when entertaining his first alleged boyfriend, he would often engage him in a round. He was also an avid fan of The Ed Sullivan Show, which he would eventually appear on during his heyday. This keen interest in games and television programs lent itself to the many victories Perkins achieved in game shows like Password, where he easily got his partner to guess the secret word. Even his regular impersonations of famous actors and costars did him good when he appeared on What's My Line? and easily fooled the panelists.

His wit was not the only thing employed during activities. Tab Hunter remembered Perkins purchasing a deluxe portable ping-pong table for him one Christmas. "We set it up on the terrace and played marathon matches." His shrewdness, though, made frequent appearances during their private meetings and dates: "On occasion, Tony would go with me to the barn or go to a show I was riding in, but he wasn't crazy about horses. Sometimes we'd head up to Watson Webb's place at Lake Arrowhead to water-ski. He wasn't the athletic type, however. His amusement came from using his quirky, brainy charm and extremely dry humor."

Political views

Perkins was a Democrat who supported many progressive causes, such as civil rights and feminism. Perkins participated in the 1965 Selma march for the right for African Americans to vote, and there are numerous photos and videos documenting his participation, most notably where he stands to the left of Martin Luther King Jr., who is being waved at by Harry Belafonte. He was one of the many performers at the "Stars for Freedom" rally during the marches who entertained King and the rest of the marchers, singing folk songs and giving brief speeches. He also continued on to Montgomery, the Alabama state capital, the next day.

Perkins promoted feminism, famously proclaiming in 1983: "Women's liberation has liberated me too." He openly acknowledged that he believed men should take on "motherly" roles as well when raising their children and that he changed diapers and fed his infants–something he said he did not need to receive praise for.

Despite the fact that he remained mostly closeted for his entire life, Perkins did express his support for LGBTQ+ rights occasionally. In an interview with Boze Hadleigh, he stated that the idea that marriage is primarily between a man and a woman was "archaic," and that, if having children was the sole reason to get married, "gays can adopt." Even before getting diagnosed with the illness, Perkins also regularly volunteered at Project Angel Food, a non-profit organization which delivered meals to HIV and AIDS patients. In September 1986, six years before his death, Perkins also released a PSA urging people to "fights AIDS with the facts."

Religion
Although his mother had been born in a strict religious household, Perkins was not. The only discussions that arose about religion while growing up were begun by Perkins, usually to disgust his mother. It was because of this that Perkins classified himself as an atheist throughout his lifetime, though he celebrated holidays like Christmas in a non-religious context.

Perkins rarely discussed religion outside of his character's faiths (for example, he played a minister in Crimes of Passion). Whenever he did talk about it personally, it was almost always tied with how religion was often used as an excuse not to legalize same-sex marriage. Speaking to Boze Hadleigh later on in life, he said, "Common sense isn't really that common, particularly when religion enters the picture."

Death
During the filming of Psycho IV: The Beginning, Perkins was undergoing treatment for facial palsy. He was tested for HIV after an article in National Enquirer, a tabloid newspaper, said he was HIV-positive. Ms. Berenson said her husband had not been tested for HIV but had been given a series of blood tests in Los Angeles for the palsy on the side of his face. Ms. Berenson said she assumed that someone had tested her husband's blood for the virus and leaked the results to the tabloid.

Perkins hid the fact that he had AIDS from the public for two years, going in and out of hospitals under assumed names. During this time, his wife and children regularly tested; they all always came back negative. It was not until a few weeks before his death that he went public with the disease, although he had been working on movies during the time of his illness. He died at his Los Angeles home on September 12, 1992, from AIDS-related pneumonia aged 60. In a statement prepared before his death, Perkins said, "I chose not to go public about [having AIDS] because, to misquote Casablanca, 'I'm not much good at being noble,' but it doesn't take much to see that the problems of one old actor don't amount to a hill of beans in this crazy world. I have learned more about love, selflessness and human understanding from the people I have met in this great adventure in the world of AIDS than I ever did in the cutthroat, competitive world in which I spent my life." Perkins never disclosed how he got the disease.

His urn, inscribed "Don't Fence Me In", is in an altar on the terrace of his former home in the Hollywood Hills.

Legacy

Perkins is considered a cultural icon and an influential figure in film because of his long career, most notably his defining role as Norman Bates in Psycho. Countless references, spoofs, and documentaries have been made about the thriller and his homicidal character, and it has led many to pronounce the motion picture as the greatest horror film of all time. AFI named Norman Bates the second greatest villain of all time, beaten only by Hannibal Lecter from The Silence of the Lambs.

The character of Norman Bates himself has also been referenced numerous times in both music and film. As early as 1964, just four years after the release of Psycho, Bob Dylan referenced the film extensively on his track "Motorpsycho Nightmare," a humorous tale about a traveling salesman. Perkins is even mentioned by name:

Even after the immediate release of Psycho, its influence remained prominent. In 1977, Blondie referenced Norman Bates on their track "Kidnapper": Hey, you've got an unnerving face/And twitchin' eyes like Norman Bates." In 1981, English band Landscape released the song "Norman Bates" with the chorus "My name is Norman Bates; I'm just a normal guy." In 1999, Eminem referenced Bates on "Role Model": "I'm 'bout as normal as Norman Bates with deformative traits/...Mother, are you there? I love you/I never meant to hit you over the head with that shovel (That shovel)." Five years later, Kanye West paid homage to Perkins's homicidal character on "Gossip Files": "Uh, they are the dream (Killer Norman Bates)." Even fifty-five years after the film's release, Lil Wayne mentioned the iconic character on "Amazing Amy": "I'm Norman Bates and this bitch ain't normal, our kids gon' be nuts (Not the babies!)." Perkins was mentioned by name in the iconic 1996 film Scream, where Billy Loomis, about to kill Sidney Prescott, says, "'We all go a little mad sometimes'–Anthony Perkins, Psycho." This seemed to only solidify Perkins's icon status in the horror genre.

It was not just Psycho that was admired. Perkins's first major motion picture, Friendly Persuasion, received an abrupt resurgence in interest after President Ronald Reagan labeled the film as his favorite. It also served diplomatic purposes: during one of their five summit meetings, Reagan gifted the film to Soviet general secretary Mikhail Gorbachev because he viewed the film as symbolic of the need to find an alternative to war as a means of resolving differences between peoples. One Quaker commentator stated: "Friendly Persuasion seems to me to come about as close to truth and fairness as I expect to see Hollywood get in a treatment of Quakerism; I recommend it to every Quaker parent, as projecting images their children ought to see and imitate... I believe (critics have) woefully misjudged the film, on several counts: its place in American cinema, the characters and their roles, its historicity, and, not least, its value as an expression of the Peace Testimony. Here, for perhaps the only time, I think Ronald Reagan was closer to the truth when he commended the film to Gorbachev because it 'shows not the tragedy of war, but the problems of pacifism, the nobility of patriotism as well as the love of peace. Fear Strikes Out also was subjected to similar treatment after it was nominated for the American Film Institute's 2008 list in the sports film category. Even his European films were praised: eight years after Perkins's death, renowned and respected film critic Roger Ebert called The Trial a masterpiece.

Even if they were not distinguished by an award, many of Perkins's films earned cult followings throughout the years. The Trial was one of them, with some people considering the film even better than Citizen Kane. Pretty Poison was another instance, and perhaps the most famous. Television appearances like Evening Primrose and Remember My Name also received this treatment, with Primrose finding a big fan in famous singer Michael Jackson. The same occurred with The Black Hole and Crimes of Passion.

Perkins has also been considered an icon of the New York actors of Hollywood's Golden Age, often being compared to legendary performers Marlon Brando, Montgomery Clift, and even James Dean, whom he was once set to replace. He became a poster child for neurotic and shy men, many of whom felt outcast in average American society. Other times, he was the model for odd boys with murderous tendencies. Either way, Perkins was always praised for his heartfelt and dedicated performances, as Brando, Clift, and Dean had been. Generations of actors were inspired by him, as Sebastian Stan put: "I have a bit of an obsession with the 1950's and all those actors from Montgomery Clift to James Dean and Anthony Perkins. Just that whole era of Tennessee Williams to Elia Kazan. The whole idea of New York and the whole thing becomes kind of romantic in your head." Jane Fonda credited Perkins alone with making her comfortable in front of the camera, and Michael Simkims, who worked with Perkins just months before his death on A Demon in My View, remembered Perkins well for his professionalism and willingness to help anyone–including himself–who was having trouble with a scene. Even established actors admired his abilities, as Maria Cooper Janis remembered about her father, Gary Cooper: "I know my father adored Tony Perkins. He thought he was one hell of an actor." After his death, Perkins's art still lingered in Hollywood, especially in the Academy Award-nominated thriller film Knives Out, which was inspired by The Last of Sheila, according to the film's director-producer Rian Johnson.

It was not just his professional life that became part of Perkins's legacy. He was outspoken about politically left causes, making him appealing to liberals. He was recognized by numerous minorities, including the ones he belonged to, as a tireless advocate for the causes he stood for, such as civil rights, feminism, and (even despite his own closeted nature) LGBTQ+ rights and same-sex marriage. By the late 1960s, just as the Stonewall riots hit their stride and gay rights protests began to appear all over the country, Perkins and his lover, Grover Dale, were seen as role models for gay professionals who wanted to have open relationships.

His death from AIDS-related causes also greatly affected how he was remembered. Alongside Rock Hudson, Perkins is considered one of the most significant actors to have died from the disease. There were countless tributes to him around the world, pouring in from news stations and average citizens. In New Zealand, Perkins was one of the many famous people honored in their national AIDS remembrance quilt in 1994.

Although rumors had always persisted, Perkins wasn't officially classified as gay until a posthumous biography by Charles Winecoff entitled Split Image: the Life of Anthony Perkins was published in 1996. The book delves deep into Perkins's personal life and his battle with his sexuality while being a poster-child for heterosexual men, something the author claimed deeply tormented him. The biography's publication led to Perkins being featured in numerous gay magazines, most notably The Advocate.

In 2005, former-partner Tab Hunter released a memoir, Tab Hunter Confidential, in which he publicly came out as a gay man. In the autobiography, he admitted to his relationship with Perkins for the first time after having previously denied it to biographers. He detailed their three- to four-year affair, with its many ups and downs. "We were both drawn to each other because we were both ambitious young actors swimming in the Hollywood fishbowl," Hunter wrote, "where the waters are dark and murky and treacherous, especially if you've got a 'secret. This returned public interest to Perkins once more, this time as both a cinematic and gay icon.

Nearly a decade later, Perkins was portrayed by British actor James D'Arcy in the 2012 biographical drama Hitchcock, which starred Anthony Hopkins as Alfred Hitchcock and Helen Mirren as Alma Reville, about the filming of Psycho. His character was featured briefly, with most of the screen time going to Scarlett Johansson, who played Janet Leigh. His homosexuality was never explicitly mentioned, though it was heavily implied. Three years afterwards, Tab Hunter released a Jeffrey Schwarz-directed documentary, Tab Hunter Confidential, where he further elaborated on his life as a closeted movie star and surviving show-business. Perkins was a substantial addition in the film, whom Hunter said he had a "wonderful relationship with. I was comfortable with him. I did trust him." He also spoke for the first time about his reaction to Perkins's wife, children, and conversion therapy. The film was well received by critics, and Perkins's sexuality and relationship with Hunter became a popular story that circulated through newspapers.

A year following Tab Hunter Confidentials release, Perkins's son, Oz, released the Netflix-distributed I Am the Pretty Thing That Lives in the House, a horror film about a caretaker for an elderly woman. Paula Prentiss, who had starred alongside Perkins in Catch-22, was cast because of her association with the late star and was the only option his son had in mind. In interviews, Oz discussed how the film was a way to connect with his deceased father and how horror (since Perkins is a horror icon) was the only way to do it. The soundtrack for the film was composed by Elvis Perkins, Perkins's second son, and "You Keep Coming Back (Like a Song)" off of Perkins's 1958 From My Heart... album was a central part of the plot. In the film, the characters can also be seen watching Friendly Persuasion.

In 2018, Zachary Quinto and J. J. Abrams announced that a new film was in the works. Entitled Tab and Tony ("hesitantly," as they later reported), the film would follow the Tab Hunter/Anthony Perkins relationship from Hunter's point of view, and was based on both Hunter's documentary and memoir. Pulitzer Prize- and Tony Award-winning writer Doug Wright was attached to create the screenplay, and even after Hunter's death a month after the announcement, Quinto announced that plans to create the film were still in place. In 2019, Allan Glaser, Tab Hunter's husband, who was signed onto the film as a producer, made a positive update about the film's progress and stated that Andrew Garfield was a possible candidate to play Perkins.

Perkins was a part of Philippe Halsman's famous "Jump" series, in which Halsman requested all famous sitters to leap for him under the impression that while people were trained in many other things, no one was ever taught how to jump. Alongside famous Hollywood contemporaries like Eartha Kitt, Audrey Hepburn, Marilyn Monroe, Sammy Davis Jr., Grace Kelly, Sophia Loren, and even Tab Hunter, Halsman's photo of a jumping Perkins has been widely reproduced and shared over the years.

For his work, Perkins received two stars on the Hollywood Walk of Fame: one for motion pictures (6821 Hollywood Blvd.) and one for television (6801 Hollywood Blvd.).

Filmography

Film

Television

Stage

Discography

References

Bibliography

Further reading
 Bergan, Ronald: Anthony Perkins: A Haunted Life. London: Little, Brown and Company, 1995; .
 Hilton, Johan: Monster i garderoben: En bok om Anthony Perkins och tiden som skapade Norm Bates. Stockholm: Natur & Kultur, 2015; . 
 Capua, Michelangelo "Anthony Perkins. Prigioniero della Paura." Torino, Lindau, 2003;

External links

 
 
 
 
 
 Psycho star Anthony Perkins on playing Norman Bates
 Anthony Perkins interviewed by Mike Wallace on The Mike Wallace Interview March 22, 1958

1932 births
1992 deaths
20th-century American male actors
20th-century American singers
20th-century American male singers
AIDS-related deaths in California
American male film actors
American male stage actors
American people of English descent
American gay actors
American bisexual actors
American male singers
Brooks School alumni
Buckingham Browne & Nichols School alumni
Columbia University alumni
Cannes Film Festival Award for Best Actor winners
David di Donatello winners
Deaths from pneumonia in California
Edgar Award winners
Epic Records artists
Film directors from Massachusetts
Film directors from New York City
LGBT film directors
LGBT people from New York (state)
Male actors from Boston
Male actors from New York City
Male Western (genre) film actors
New Star of the Year (Actor) Golden Globe winners
People from Wellfleet, Massachusetts
RCA Victor artists
Rollins College alumni
Theatre World Award winners
Traditional pop music singers
20th-century American LGBT people
Paramount Pictures contract players